The seventh season of Beverly Hills, 90210, an American drama television series aired from on August 21, 1996 on Fox and concluded on May 21, 1997 after 32 episodes. This season follows the gang during their senior year of college as struggle with issues such as hostage situations, relationships, racism, infidelity, HIV/AIDS, natural disasters, alcoholism, depression, drug use, pregnancy, suicide attempts, miscarriages, and sex.

The season aired Wednesday nights at 8/7c in the United States averaging 13.2 million viewers. It was released on DVD in 2009.

Synopsis
Before they swap in their flip-flops for full-time careers, the Beverly Hills 90210 gang take one last loop around campus in their senior year. As Brandon, Kelly, Donna, David, Steve, Val, and Clare battle natural disasters, face their own demons, and learn that old flames never burn out, you may see the action unfold on the screen. From losing virginities and unexpected pregnancy to David's battle with mental illness and a terrifying hostage situation on the C.U. campus, surviving their senior year will be the most difficult test they've ever faced.

Cast

Starring
Jason Priestley as Brandon Walsh
Jennie Garth as Kelly Taylor 
Ian Ziering as Steve Sanders  
Brian Austin Green as David Silver  
Tori Spelling as Donna Martin  
Tiffani Thiessen as Valerie Malone 
Joe E. Tata as Nat Bussichio  
Kathleen Robertson as Clare Arnold

Recurring
Ann Gillespie as Jackie Taylor 
Jill Novick as Tracy Gaylian 
Katherine Cannon as Felice Martin 
Michael Durrell as John Martin

Notable guest stars
Jamie Walters as Ray Pruit 
James Eckhouse as Jim Walsh

Episodes

Source:

References

1996 American television seasons
1997 American television seasons
Beverly Hills, 90210 seasons